The Williams House was a historic house about  north of  Arkansas Highway 267 on County Road 54, southwest of Searcy, Arkansas.  It was a single story cross-gabled wood-frame structure, clad in a combination of weatherboard and asbestos shingling, with a foundation of brick piers.  Its eastern gable end was notable for its particularly ornate decoration.  It was built about 1910.

The house was listed on the National Register of Historic Places in 1992.  It has been listed as destroyed in the Arkansas Historic Preservation Program database.

See also
National Register of Historic Places listings in White County, Arkansas

References

Houses on the National Register of Historic Places in Arkansas
Houses completed in 1910
Houses in Searcy, Arkansas
National Register of Historic Places in Searcy, Arkansas
1910 establishments in Arkansas
Former buildings and structures in Arkansas